The 1966 Toronto Argonauts finished in fourth place in the Eastern Conference with a 5–9 record and failed to make the playoffs.

Regular season

Standings

Schedule

References

Toronto Argonauts seasons
1966 Canadian Football League season by team